Atrilinea macrolepis is a species of cyprinid in the genus Atrilinea, that inhabits China. Its maximum length is 10 cm (3.9 inches).

References

Cyprinidae
Freshwater fish of China
Cyprinid fish of Asia